A 12-car rally is a type of car rally, often run by motor clubs as a simple and strictly amateur form of the sport.

12-car rallies are run to Navigational Rally rules, which are based on navigational skills rather than speed, and with usually a notable social element too. In the United Kingdom, the rules for 12-cars are governed by Motorsport UK  and are as follows:

 Maximum of 12 competing vehicles per event (hence the name)
 Generally only standard road cars permitted, not fully prepared cars (this is at the discretion of the organising club, but is widely upheld)
 Maximum 30 mph average speed only
 "Plot 'n' bash" navigation only
 No timing to the second permitted, only to the previous minute
 "PR" (public relations) work as necessary if the route affects residential areas, this is as for a road rally but the requirements are not quite as strict
 Police to be informed of the event, though route information does not need to be submitted and approved
 Route authorisation must be granted from the Motorsport UK's local representative.

References

Road rallying